The Angel of Portugal, also referred to as the Guardian  Angel of Portugal (Anjo da Guarda de Portugal), the Holy Guardian Angel of Portugal (Santo Anjo da Guarda de Portugal), the Custodian Angel (Anjo Custódio) or the Angel of Peace (Anjo da Paz) is celebrated as the Guardian angel of Portugal. It is the only "national angel" recognized as such.
Portugal celebrates the Feast of the Angel of Portugal on June 10.

The east wall of the chapel at the Batalha Monastery, the construction of which commenced in 1386,  had an altar dedicated to the Guardian Angel of Portugal. In 1504, by request of King Manuel I of Portugal, Pope Julius II created the feast of the Custodian Angel of the Kingdom (Anjo Custódio do Reino).

The cult of the Guardian Angel of Portugal declined considerably after the 17th century, and was officially restored in 1952, its feast day being inserted into the Portuguese liturgical calendar by Pius XII.

Lúcia dos Santos and her cousins Francisco and Jacinta Marto, the three children who claimed in 1917 to have experienced a series of Marian apparitions at the Our Lady of Fátima events, claimed the angel to have appeared before them three times in 1916.

The Angel of Portugal has at times been identified as Saint Michael.

See also
 List of angels in theology

References 

Michael (archangel)
Sculptures of angels
Angels
Angels in Christianity
National symbols of Portugal